WXNY-LD (channel 32) is a low-power television station in New York City. The station is owned by Word of God Fellowship. In addition to general entertainment programming WXNY-LD is currently available on Local BTV online and the app.

History

As W63AS and W38AM
WXNY originally began on channel 63 as W63AS, and for a while it was an out of market translator of WVIA-TV for local schools. Like its sister station WNYX-LD, it later became a translator to the then WLIG. Due to interference to and from WMBC-TV, which is also on channel 63, it moved to channel 38 as W38AM. It became an affiliate of The Box in 1991.

As WXNY-LP
In 1994, call letters were changed to WXNY-LP and the station moved to channel 39. Around this time, it became an affiliate of a Spanish network called LTV; it continued to carry The Box on a part-time basis.

In 2002, WXNY-LP moved to channel 32 and became an affiliate of the Home Shopping Network, at the same time, its sister station, WNYN-LP, moved from channel 51 to channel 39 and became an affiliate of Azteca América. When W60AI became the HSN affiliate for the area, WXNY-LP became an affiliate of America's Store.

After the closing of America's Store, WXNY-LP began to air programming similar to that seen on public-access television cable television channels, including several hours per afternoon and overnight of a locally produced music video call-in request show hosted by young men and women in their late teens and early twenties. Callers would pay approximately $3.00 per call and could request up to two music videos per call. They could also briefly discuss issues going on in their personal lives. Other programming fare included a TV psychic. Programming during this time was often simulcasted on co-owned LPTV station WNYX-LP.

In summer of 2007, the station suspended operations as the studio moved to its new location in Times Square. By late November, it went back on the air as a relay translator of WNYX-LP. In April 2009, WXNY-LP once more suspended operations, due to a lack of technical personnel to operate the station.

As WXNY-LD
In late 2010, WXNY returned to the air for the third time with a religious and Infomercial format under the LMA agreement with Jacobs Broadcasting. However, early that year, Jacobs ceased operation due to a fraud investigation and WXNY began to switch into a test pattern temporarily. In Spring 2011, Island Broadcasting agreed to sell WXNY to NY Spectrum Holdings Company. The station was sold to NY Spectrum Holdings Company and operated by NY Broadband LLC in 2010. In 2011, WXNY switched to a new format in Chinese news programming as CGTN English on DT1, CCTV-4 America on DT2, and CGTN Spanish on DT3. As of 2013 a fourth sub channel was added 32.4 as infomercials under the WXNY calls. In October 2013, WXNY-LD's frequency moved from Channel 32 to Channel 26, but they still used Channel 32 as their virtual channel. Also in the fall of 2013, the CCTV programming simulcast moved from WNYX 35 (which went dark) to WXNY sister station WNXY 43. By December 2013, WXNY left Channel 26 and returned to Channel 32. As of 2018, WXNY is currently off the air though WLIW is planning to move to channel 32. It is unknown if WXNY will return to a new channel number or deleted it. In early 2019, WXNY returns on channel 32 which only show a looping logo of a Chinese religious channel called Good TV, though it is unlikely if will be launched. On August 1, WXNY was taken off the air to make way for WLIW which moved from channel 21 to channel 32. WXNY has planned to move to channel 23 where WDVB previously occupied which has since moved to channel 22 though it is unclear whether it will moved to a new frequency. The following year, Good TV moved to WNXY and CGTN America returned to WXNY, joining with WNYX-LD. In 2022 NY Spectrum Holdings sold WXNY-LD to Word of God Fellowship and CGTN America was removed shortly afterwards reverting back to an English general entertainment format of COMFY-TV, this will be the 5th time overall in 11 years.

Technical information

Subchannels
The station's digital channel is multiplexed:

Around late 2015, two new digital sub channels were added: Rev'n and Retro TV, with infomercials moved to 32.6. As of early 2016, Retro TV and Rev'n had been added on 32.4 and 32.5, marking the station's first two English language sub-networks since the "community access" programming era of 2007-2012 and the first networks since America's Store was shown from 2004 to 2007. As of 2019 all 5 sub-channels are off the air. Following the sale to Word of God Fellowship three new sub channels was added except for CTGN Spanish which is still on 32.4.

References

Independent television stations in the United States
Retro TV affiliates
Low-power television stations in the United States
Television channels and stations established in 1983
1983 establishments in New York City
XNY-LD